Owen Gene (born 19 March 2003) is a French professional footballer who plays as a midfielder for Ligue 2 club Amiens.

Club career 
Gene signed his first professional contract with Amiens on 22 June 2021. He made his professional debut with Amiens in a 1–1 Ligue 2 tie with Le Havre AC on 20 November 2021.

References

External links

2003 births
Living people
French footballers
Association football midfielders
Amiens SC players
Ligue 2 players
Championnat National 2 players